Teekli   is a village in Sohna Mandal, Gurgaon District, Haryana state, India. It is 33.85 km south of India's capital New Delhi and lies in the foothills of the Aravali Mountains. It has a population of about 17,234 (approx) persons living in around 1,390 households. Teekli is dominated by Yadavs.

In late 1950s a few hundred Yadavs from Teekli moved to establish the new village of Samaspur.

Gurgaon Bus Stand is just 14 km away from Teekli. Transportation is very good in this village. Autos runs From Teekli to Badshahpur every 10 mins.
Nearby villages of this village are Aklimpur, Palra, Nurpur Jharsa, Badshahpur, Sakatpur, Gairatpur Baas, Bhondsi etc...

Airport

Indira Gandhi International Airport is just 31 km from Teekli which is only a 40–55 minutes car drive (depending on time of day).

Politics
Village Teekli is in Badshahpur constituency and Rakesh Daulatabad is the sitting MLA. Smt. Ravina Yadav is Sarpanch (Pardhan) of Teekli village and village has 5,000 voters.

Occupation
Main occupation of villagers is agriculture. A lot of peoples are serving in government sectors like Army, Air Force, Navy, Police, Banking, Education. Many persons of Teekli are in high posts in both the Govt. Sector and in Private Sector.

Schools
 Govt. Sr. Sec School.
 Govt. High School(Girls)
 Shri Chitragupt High School.
 Global Public school.
 Mother's Shadow Play School

 Sohna
 Ahirwal
 Samaspur

References

Villages in Gurgaon district